Ennetbürgen is a municipality in the canton of Nidwalden in Switzerland.

History

Ennetbürgen is first mentioned by 1190 as Burgin.  In 1799 it became Enet-Bürgen and in 1836 Ennerbürgen.  Since 1850 the official name has been Ennetbürgen.

Geography
Of this area, 51.7% is used for agricultural purposes, while 33.5% is forested. Of the rest of the land, 14.7% is settled (buildings or roads) and the remainder (0.1%) is non-productive (rivers, glaciers or mountains).

The municipality is located between Lake Lucerne and the foot of the Bürgenberg mountain.

Demographics
, 10.3% of the population was made up of foreign nationals. Over the last 10 years the population has grown at a rate of 8%. Most of the population speaks German  (94.2%), with Serbo-Croatian being second most common ( 1.2%) and Italian being third ( 0.9%).   the gender distribution of the population was 51.4% male and 48.6% female.

 there are 1,583 households, of which 994 households (or about 62.8%) contain only one or two individuals.  131 or about 8.3% are large households, with at least five members.

In the 2007 federal election the most popular party was the FDP which received 88.2% of the vote.  Most of the rest of votes went to local small right-wing parties (9.8%).

The entire Swiss population is generally well educated.  In Ennetbürgen about 75% of the population (between age 25-64) have completed either non-mandatory upper secondary education or additional higher education (either university or a Fachhochschule).

Ennetbürgen has an unemployment rate of 1.12%.  , there were 122 people employed in the primary economic sector and about 52 businesses involved in this sector.  318 people are employed in the secondary sector and there are 43 businesses in this sector.  718 people are employed in the tertiary sector, with 123 businesses in this sector.

The historical population is given in the following table:

Sights

The main sights of Ennetbürgen are: the chapel St. Jost, and the clergy house
St. Jost.

References

Municipalities of Nidwalden
Populated places on Lake Lucerne